Final standings of the 1974–75 Hungarian League season.

Final standings

Results

Statistical leaders

Top goalscorers

External links
 IFFHS link

Nemzeti Bajnokság I seasons
1974–75 in Hungarian football
Hun